The following is a list of notable staff and alumni from Hwa Chong Institution (HCI) and its predecessor schools, The Chinese High School (TCHS) and Hwa Chong Junior College (HCJC).

Notable staff

 Chen Wen Hsi (陈文希), Singaporean pioneer artist; taught art at TCHS.
 Lao She (老舍), writer; taught at TCHS in 1929
 Lee Kong Chian (李光前), businessman and philanthropist; served as chairman of TCHS's board of directors from 1934 to 1956
 Lim Hak Tai (林学大), founder and first principal of the Nanyang Academy of Fine Arts; taught art and mathematics at TCHS
 Liu Kang (刘抗), oil painter; taught art at TCHS
 Tan Kah Kee (陈嘉庚), businessman and philanthropist; founded TCHS in 1918
 Tan Keong Choon (陈共存), businessman and philanthropist; Tan Kah Kee's nephew; founded HCJC and served as the first chairperson of its management committee from 1974 to 1996

Notable alumni

Civil servants and politicians

Heads of State 

 Ong Teng Cheong (王鼎昌), fifth President of Singapore; graduated from TCHS in 1955

Active Singaporean Politicians 
Baey Yam Keng (马炎庆), Senior Parliamentary Secretary in the Ministry of Sustainability and the Environment and Ministry of Transport, former Senior Parliamentary Secretary in the Ministry of Culture, Community and Youth; graduated from HCJC in 1988
Chee Hong Tat (徐芳达), Senior Minister of State in the Ministry of Finance (Singapore) and Ministry of Transport (Singapore), graduated from TCHS
Grace Fu Hai Yien (傅海燕), Minister for Sustainability and the Environment and former Leader of the House; graduated from HCJC in 1981
Koh Poh Koon (许宝琨), Senior Minister of State in the Ministry of Sustainability and the Environment and Ministry of Manpower (Singapore); graduated from HCJC in 1990
 Lim Wee Kiak (林伟杰), MP for Sembawang GRC; graduated from TCHS in 1984 and from HCJC in 1986
Leon Perera, MP for Aljunied GRC, graduated from HCJC
K Muralidharan Pillai, MP for Bukit Batok SMC; graduated from HCJC in 1985
Sim Ann (沈颖), Senior Minister of State in the Ministry of National Development and Ministry of Communications and Information; graduated from HCJC in 1993
Tin Pei Ling (陈佩玲), MP for MacPherson SMC; graduated from HCJC in 2001
Tan Kiat How (陈杰豪), Minister of State in the Prime Minister's Office and Ministry of National Development
Hazel Poa, Non-constituency Member of Parliament
Denise Phua, MP for Jalan Besar GRC & Mayor of Central Singapore District
Tan Wu Meng, MP for Jurong GRC, Senior Parliamentary Secretary in the Ministry of Foreign Affairs and Ministry of Trade and Industry
Henry Kwek, MP for Kebun Baru SMC, graduated from TCHS
Louis Chua, MP for Sengkang GRC
Melvin Yong, MP for Radin Mas SMC & Assistant Secretary-General of NTUC, graduated from TCHS in 1988
Sitoh Yih Pin, MP for Potong Pasir SMC
Ang Wei Neng, MP for Jurong GRC

Retired Singaporean Politicians 
Jek Yeun Thong (易润堂), former Minister for Labour, Minister for Culture, Minister for Science and Technology, and High Commissioner to the United Kingdom and to Denmark; studied at TCHS but was expelled from school by the British colonial government in 1950
Ker Sin Tze (柯新治), former Minister of State in the Ministry of Education and Ministry of Information and the Arts
Yeo Guat Kwang (杨木光), Assistant Director-General of the National Trade Union Congress (NTUC) and former MP; graduated from TCHS in 1977
Ng Chee Meng (黄志明), former Minister in the Prime Minister's Office; eighth Chief of Defence Force; graduated from HCJC
Lee Yi Shyan (李奕贤), former MP for East Coast GRC; graduated from HCJC in 1980
Sam Tan Chin Siong (陈振泉), former Minister of State in the Ministry of Foreign Affairs and Ministry of Social and Family Development; graduated from HCJC in 1976

Singapore Armed Forces personnel 

Goh Si Hou (吴仕豪), former Chief of the Singapore Army; graduated from HCJC in 1996.
Hoo Cher Mou (符策谋), former Chief of the Republic of Singapore Air Force (RSAF); graduated from HCJC in 1984
Ng Chee Khern (黄志勤), former Chief of the RSAF; graduated from HCJC in 1983
Ng Chee Peng (黄志平), former Chief of the Republic of Singapore Navy
Ng Yat Chung (伍逸松), Chief Executive Officer of Neptune Orient Lines; fifth Chief of Defence Force; graduated from HCJC in 1979

Others 

Lim Chin Siong (林清祥), trade union leader; leftist politician of the PAP and Barisan Sosialis; studied at TCHS but was expelled from school by the British colonial government in 1952
Yam Ah Mee (杨雅镁), former Chief Executive Director of the People's Association; former Chief of the Land Transport Authority; Returning Officer in the 2011 General Election
Goh Meng Seng, leader of People's Power Party
Lim Tean, Secretary General of Peoples Voice

Business and entrepreneurs

 Calvin Cheng Ern Lee, former Nominated Member of Parliament and Chairman of Retech Group; graduated from TCHS and HCJC
 Min-Liang Tan, founder of tech company Razer.
Olivia Lum Ooi Lin (林爱莲), founder of Hyflux; graduated from HCJC in the 1980s, former Nominated Member of Parliament
 Tan Chin Hwee (陈竞辉), CEO (Asia-Pacific) of Trafigura; graduated from HCJC
 Brandon Wade, founder of online dating websites; he studied at HCJC
 Wee Cho Yaw, Chairman of United Overseas Bank; studied at TCHS but his studies were disrupted by the Japanese invasion of Malaya and Singapore in 1941–1942
 Kenny Yap Kim Lee, founder of Qian Hu Corporation
 Tan Chin Hwee, businessman and business academic, member of Emerging Stronger Taskforce (EST) set up under the Future Economy Council (FEC)

Academics, scientists and writers

 Chen Xujing, historian, sociologist and university administrator
 Koh Buck Song, poet, writer and journalist; graduated from HCJC
 Madeleine Lee, poet
 Colin Cheong, award winning writer
 Thio Li-ann, former Nominated Member of Parliament

Sportspeople

 Benedict Tan, gold medal winner for sailing at the 1994 Asian Games and four-time SEA Games gold medalist; former Nominated Member of Parliament; medical director at the Singapore Sports Medicine Centre; graduated from HCJC
Soh Rui Yong, long-distance runner who holds four national records in Singapore, winning gold at the SEA Games in 2017; graduated from TCHS

Arts, entertainment and media personalities

 Film, television and theatre:
Anthony Chen, film director; graduated from TCHS
 Sharon Au, former MediaCorp actress; graduated from HCJC
Adam Chen, MediaCorp actor; graduated from TCHS and HCJC
Chua Lam, food critic, columnist and television personality
Kuo Pao Kun, playwright, theatre director and arts activist; attended TCHS in the 1950s
Ng Hui, MediaCorp actress; graduated from HCJC
Alan Tern, MediaCorp actor; graduated from TCHS and HCJC
Nelson Chia, co-founder of Nine Years Theatre
Woon Tai Ho, veteran media practitioner, TV producer, art collector and writer, founder of Channel NewsAsia
 Music
Bevlyn Khoo, jazz pop singer songwriter
Choo Huey, music conductor; graduated from TCHS in the late 1940s
Eric Moo Chii Yuan, singer-songwriter; studied at TCHS
Joel Tan, stage name Gentle Bones, singer-songwriter; graduated from HCI in 2012
Liang Wern Fook, music composer; graduated from HCJC
 Lorraine Tan, singer-songwriter and founder of My Singapore Music Charity Education Project; graduated from HCJC
 Lydia Tan Di Ya, female champion of singing contest Project SuperStar Season 2; graduated from HCJC
Ng Chee Yang, champion of singing contest Campus SuperStar Season 1; graduated from HCI in 2007
Tan Boon Wah, singer-songwriter
Tan Wee-Hsin, music conductor and violist with the Singapore Symphony Orchestra; graduated from TCHS and HCJC
 Arts
 Grace Quek, better known as Annabel Chong, web designer, artist and former pornographic actress; graduated from HCJC
 Ho Ho Ying, expressionist painter and art critic; attended TCHS in the 1950s
Tan Swie Hian, artist; graduated from TCHS in 1964

Others

 Jane Lee, first woman from Southeast Asia to scale the Seven Summits; associate with McKinsey & Company; graduated from HCJC
 Lee Kin Mun, better known as mrbrown, blogger and political critic; graduated from HCJC

References

Hwa Chong Institution
Hwa Chong Institution people
Alumni by secondary school in Singapore